FCW is a professional wrestling television program for Florida Championship Wrestling, WWE's developmental territory. It debuted on October 5, 2008 on Bright House Sports Network in Tampa Bay and Central Florida and ran for close to four years until it aired its final episode on July 15, 2012. Its concept was merged with WWE NXT, where developmental wrestlers were previously appearing, in its sixth season.

The first episode was taped on July 17, 2008, at the opening of their new arena. The final taping was held June 1, 2012.

Special episodes

References

2008 American television series debuts
2012 American television series endings
Television series by WWE
Florida Championship Wrestling